Dekada '70 is a 2002 Filipino historical drama film directed by Chito S. Roño and based on the 1983 novel of the same name by Lualhati Bautista. Set in the Philippines during the period of martial law under Ferdinand Marcos, the film follows the struggles of the middle-class Bartolome family. It stars Vilma Santos and Christopher De Leon as parents raising five sons amidst the tense political background. Their sons are played by Piolo Pascual, Carlos Agassi, Marvin Agustin, Danilo Barrios, and John Wayne Sace.

The film is now restored in high-definition by the ABS-CBN Film Archives and Central Digital Lab.

Plot 

A middle-class Manila neighborhood is home to the Bartolome family. Couple Amanda Bartolome (Vilma Santos) and Julián Bartolome Sr. (Christopher de Leon) are parents to sons Julian "Jules" Bartolome Jr. (Piolo Pascual), Isagani "Gani" Bartolome (Carlos Agassi), Emmanuel "Em" Bartolome (Marvin Agustin), Jason Bartolome (Danilo Barrios) and Benjamin "Bingo" Bartolome (John Wayne Sace).

1965–1970 
In 1965, as a young boy, Gani fights with his friend while playing a game in the street, their mothers come to stop the fighting and make them stay away from each other. In the streets of Manila, protests take place when the Philippines enters the Vietnam War. Five years later, Philippine president Ferdinand Marcos wins his re-election bid as president. Julián stops Amanda from looking for a job with Amanda intent on pursuing it. At dinner time, Jules and Gani speak about the upcoming Junior-Senior Prom. At the prom, Gani tries to grope his partner and gets kicked . The Bartolomes get stuck in traffic in the streets on the way home from the event due to a protest with effigy burning taking place near the Legislative Building.

1971 
A protest takes place in the University of the Philippines, where Jules with his best friend Willy (Jhong Hilario) become activists and join a resistance movement. At the same time, Emmanuel begins writing illegal exposés and other kinds of banned literature. During protests, attendees sing the Philippine National Anthem, "Lupang Hinirang", with raised fists. The protesters outnumber the authorities but their efforts to make them leave become futile and they retreat. Julián becomes furious when he discovers their activities, and he angrily explains to Jules and Willy the consequences of their actions, the suspension of the writ of habeas corpus and the disappearance of the student leader Charlie del Rosario.

Gani reveals his plans to apply for a job in the United States Navy to Julian but is overheard by Jules, who admonishes his actions as a lack of patriotism. Gani furiously explains to him that working for the US government entitles one to a high salary with numerous benefits. Julián accepts the plan, thus making Gani the family's newest breadwinner. Sometime later, another protest depicts President Ferdinand Marcos acting as a lackey to Uncle Sam, and crucifying a Filipino. Bingo pulls down a flying kite and Amanda discovers that the kite is made out of copies of the Communist newspaper Ang Bayan. Julián discovers that Jules is an activist and he sneaks up to his room to check his rebellious pamphlets.

1972 
Marcos declares martial law on nationwide television, as well as imposing nighttime curfews in order to round up anyone suspected of being a terrorist or communist to be imprisoned. The change of events results in interrogations, tortures, and deaths. Gani accidentally impregnates his girlfriend Evelyn (Dimples Romana). Two police cars escort the Bartolomes to Evelyn's house where her father blackmails them into marrying her.

Jules comes home late and confesses to his family that Willy was tortured to death for staying past curfew. He later reveals his plan to travel to Bicol and join the Communist Party's NPA group despite his mother's opposition.

1973–1976 
Evelyn gives birth to a baby girl. Sometime later, Gani leaves for the United States via Subic Bay and Evelyn returns to her family. Emmanuel plans to go to Bataan to research an article on the Bataan Nuclear Power Plant. Julián furiously opposes as the topic is a possible target for roundup under Martial Law. 

Jules brings a wounded friend home for care, as a hospital would arouse too much suspicion, but leaves two days later. After two months of not returning, Jules is revealed to have been married to fellow NPA member Mara (Ana Capri) and they now have a baby boy. One night, the family burns Jules' anti-government pamphlets out of fear of the presence of authorities who instead turn out to be Christmas carolers.

Amanda receives a phone call informing her that Jules has been imprisoned.

Amanda and Julian visit Jules in prison where he recounts his experience with torture and solitary confinement. 

At Christmas Jules' family, including his parents and siblings along with his wife and son, visit him in prison, and his fellow inmates are singing Christmas songs.

Final years of the 1970s 
Amanda is involved with a non-government organization (similar to Amnesty International or any other human rights groups) reaching out to families of victims of human rights abuse.

Amanda and Julian search for Jason whose whereabouts are unknown after a night of being out. Emmanuel joins in the search and discovers in a morgue that his brother's body was found inside Manila Zoo with multiple stab wounds.

Amanda, drunk, not knowing what Emmanuel has found, berates him for coming home late. Emmanuel tells his father Julian of his discovery and Julian attempts suicide in grief. Jules attends the wake in handcuffs and in tears.

Amanda and Julian blame each other on their son's death and on the verge of separation, are interrupted by news that Jules is finally released from prison. 

The family reunites at dinner, with Jules' wife and son, and Evelyn and her daughter. Jules announces to the family that he will be returning to the revolution, which Julian accepts and wishes him good luck. Eventually, Amanda and Julian get emotional and reconcile.

In the end, Amanda and her son Emmanuel participate in singing the Philippine National Anthem at a play about the revolution written by Emmanuel himself.

Epilogue 
In 1983, the Bartolome family attend the wake of Ninoy Aquino at the Santo Domingo Church in Quezon City after his assassination. Amanda joins a large group of activists at the Post Office Building to overthrow the Marcos regime once and for all. The Marcos regime is peacefully overthrown during the 1986 People Power Revolution, and Corazon Aquino is sworn into office as president.

Cast 
 Vilma Santos as Amanda Bartolome - a mother of the Bartolomes with five young sons. After discovering copies of communist pamphlets lying around the house, she accepts Jules' inclination to become a rebel fighter.
 Christopher de Leon as Julián Bartolome, Sr. - the head of the Bartolome family who wants his children to become successful in life. Being suspicious of Jules' inclination to become an antigovernmental activist, he also became convinced when they find copies of rebellious pamphlets lying around the house and supports him to rally against corruption in the government.
 Piolo Pascual as Julian "Jules" Bartolome, Jr. - the first son of the Bartolomes. After Amanda and Julian discover his inclination to the Communist movement, they confronted their son about them, and he had to admit his decision. At first, conflict ensues in the family. Eventually, the parents learned to accept their son's decision, and eventually became proud of him. Since then, their home became a constant place of recreation for Jules who often brought his friend along with him. Jules was subsequently sent to prison after the said friend betrayed the family by revealing himself to be an undercover government operative. Jericho Rosales was the first choice to play Jules but had to drop out of the role in order to focus on Pangako Sa 'Yo.
 Carlos Agassi as Isagani "Gani" Bartolome - the second child of the Bartolomes. After planning to work for the United States Navy despite Jules' objections due to the latter's lack of patriotism, Gani becomes the family's second breadwinner and their hope to raise their social status. He, however, quickly became the Bartolomes' goat (figure of shame) after the accidental pregnancy of his girlfriend Evelyn, whom he is forced to marry. He later fathers the family's first grandchild, Annaliza while working with the U.S. Navy.
 Marvin Agustin as Emmanuel "Em" Bartolome - the third child of the Bartolomes who writes banned literature whilst maintaining a mischievous, carefree outward personality. He also heard the news of Jason's death in 1977.
 Danilo Barrios as Jason Bartolome - the fourth child of the Bartolomes who was dating his girlfriend Bernadette. He was killed and stabbed multiple times by corrupt policemen in 1977, with his death later heard by his elder brother Emmanuel.
 John Wayne Sace as Benjamin "Bingo" Bartolome - the youngest of the children. He remains calm during the 70s.
 Kris Aquino – a student leader.
 Ana Capri as Mara - the wife of Jules Bartolome.
 Dimples Romana as Evelyn - the girlfriend and later wife of Isagani Bartolome.
 Jhong Hilario as Willy - Jules' best friend and activist. He was killed by torturers in 1972.
 Carlo Muñoz as René.
 Tirso Cruz III as Evelyn's Father - an unnamed character who is shown to be strict and only appears in two scenes; the Evelyn's household scene and the wedding scene. After Evelyn is returned to her family's household by the Bartolome couple with Isagani late one night, he pressures Isagani into a shotgun wedding after hearing of his daughter's stay with the latter.
 Orestes Ojeda as Dr. Rodrigo.
 Asley Fontanoza – Carlos Bartolome, Jr. (Caloy/Cocoy).
 Marianne de la Riva as Evelyn's Mother - an unnamed character who is shown sobbing after Evelyn's return to the household, and is a witness to the shotgun wedding by the unnamed father of Evelyn.
 Manjo del Mundo - a policeman
 Cacai Bautista - a rallyist.

Awards

Gawad URIAN
 Best Picture
 Best Screenplay
 Best Actress – Vilma Santos
 Best Supporting Actor – Piolo Pascual
PMPC STAR Awards
 Best Actress – Vilma Santos
 Best Supporting Actor – Piolo Pascual
 Best Screenplay – Lualhati Bautista
FAP/Luna Awards
 Best Actress – Vilma Santos
 Best Supporting Actor – Piolo Pascual
 Best Production Design
Gawad TANGLAW
 Best Film
 Best Director – Chito Roño
 Best Actress – Vilma Santos
 Best Actor – Christopher de Leon
 Best Supporting Actor – Piolo Pascual
Young Critics Circle
 Best Film
 Best Director – Chito Roño
 Best Screenplay – Lualhati Bautista
 Best Performers – Vilma Santos and Piolo Pascual
 Best Sound
25th Catholic Mass Media Awards
 Best Film
Cinema One's RAVE Awards
 Best Film
 Best Performance – Vilma Santos
Gawad Pasado
 Best Film
 Best Director – Chito Roño
 Best Screenplay – Lualhati Bautista
 Best Actress – Vilma Santos
 Best Actor – Christopher de Leon
 Best Supporting Actor – Piolo Pascual
CineManila International Film Festival
 Best Actress – Vilma Santos
 Netpack Film Awardee – Dekada '70

References

External links

Star Cinema drama films
Philippine historical drama films
2000s historical drama films
2002 films
Filipino-language films
Films set in the 1970s
1970s in the Philippines
Films about Filipino families
Films based on Philippine novels
Films directed by Chito S. Roño
Presidency of Ferdinand Marcos
Presidency of Joseph Estrada
Star Cinema films
2002 drama films